Buddhism in the United Kingdom has a small but growing number of adherents which, according to a Buddhist organisation, is mainly a result of conversion. In the UK census for 2011, there were about 247,743 people who registered their religion as Buddhism, and about 174,000 who cited religions other than Christianity, Buddhism, Hinduism, Judaism, Islam, Jainism and Sikhism. This latter figure is likely to include some people who follow the traditional Chinese folk religion which also includes some elements of Buddhism.

Statistics
At the 2011 Census, 178,453 people in England and Wales ticked the Buddhist box. Of these, the main places of birth were UK 66,522, Far East 59,931 and South Asia 9,847, and the main ethnic groups were White 59,040, Chinese 34,354, Asian 13,919, Mixed 4,647, Black 1,507 and Other 34,036. In Scotland, people were asked both their current religion and the one that they were brought up in. 6,830 people gave Buddhism as their current religion, and 4,704 said they were brought up in it, with an overlap of 3,146. In Northern Ireland, the published report which listed religions and philosophies in order of size reported 'Buddhist' at 533. For details of Buddhism in the individual countries of the United Kingdom, see:

 Buddhism in England
 Buddhism in Northern Ireland
 Buddhism in Scotland
 Buddhism in Wales

According to the 2021 United Kingdom census, Buddhists in England & Wales enumerated 272,508, or 0.5% of the population

History

Relationship with the Buddhist World
Although the practice of Buddhism in the United Kingdom started in the 19th century, the UK have had relations with Buddhist countries for more than a millennia. Britain may have had relations through the rule of the Romans, though most of these were directly from Rome. The religion of Manichaeism, a former major religion which had Buddhist influences, was said to have spread throughout the empire as far as Britannia.
There wasn't much contact between the Buddhist world and Britain until the early modern age. Archaeological evidence found in Sutton Hoo suggested that Britain was part of an international culture and the garnets discovered, with dated back to the Anglo-Saxon period came as far as Sri Lanka. Sri Lanka at that time was a strong Buddhist civilization called 'Anuradhapura' having contact with Ancient Rome and Greece and it was also known that during the Anglo-Saxon period, Sri Lanka was the most distant land away to the Anglo-Saxons. During the 16th century, many English sailors and travelers reached Asia with one notable of Ralph Fitch. Ralph Fitch was known to have visited various places in Asia between 1583 and 1591, including various Buddhist countries such as present-day Myanmar, Ayutthaya (a strong Buddhist kingdom situated in the areas of Thailand, Malaysia, Cambodia and Myanmar), the Himalayas and Ceylon. William Adams was the first Englishman to reach Japan in 1600, at that time the country was also Buddhist.

History of Buddhism in the UK
Early Buddhist presence could be seen in the 1810s. Adam Sri Munni Ratna, a Buddhist monk from Ceylon (Sri Lanka), travelled to England with his cousin (also a Buddhist monk) while accompanying Sir Alexander Johnston in 1818. They were keen to learn Christianity as they were travelling to England. During their brief stay, the two monks were baptised and returned to Ceylon where they entered government service.

In Britain, the earliest Buddhist influences came from the Theravada traditions of Burma, Thailand, and Sri Lanka. Interest in them was primarily scholarly to begin with, and a tradition of study grew up that resulted in the foundation of the Pali Text Society in 1881, which undertook the significant task of translating the Pāli Canon of Theravada Buddhist Tradition into English. The start of interest in Buddhism as a path of practice had been pioneered by the original Theosophists, the Russian Madame Blavatsky and the American Colonel Olcott, who in 1880 became the first Westerners to receive the Three refuges and Five precepts, the formal conversion ceremony by which one traditionally accepted and becomes a Buddhist.

 Burma and  Ceylon were both colonies of the British Empire and both colonies had large or were majority Buddhist. Immigration from the two colonies would have happened. During the 19th to early 20th centuries lascar sailors (people from Asia who worked in British ships) came and settled in the UK. Some of the lascars came from the seafaring communities of Burma and Ceylon. There were also Chinese seamen who settled in the United Kingdom, establishing Chinatowns in Liverpool and London. 

The Buddhist Society, London (originally known as the Buddhist Lodge) was founded in 1924 by Christmas Humphreys, another Theosophist who converted to Buddhism. In 1925, the Sri Lankan Buddhist missionary Anagarika Dharmapala brought to England the Maha Bodhi Society, which he had founded with the collaboration of the British journalist and poet Edwin Arnold.

A slow trickle from United Kingdom travelled to Asia for deeper spiritual commitment via monastic ordination, mainly as Theravadin monks, like Ñāṇavīra Thera and Ñāṇamoli Bhikkhu who went to Island Hermitage in Sri Lanka for their Sāmaṇera ordination in 1949. Kapilavaddho Bhikkhu introduced the Dhammakaya tradition to the UK in 1954 in this way and founded the English Sangha Trust in 1955. Theosophical and Theravadin influences continued throughout the early twentieth century, though the 1950s saw the development of interest in Zen Buddhism. In 1966, Freda Bedi, a British woman, became the first Western woman to take ordination in Tibetan Buddhism.

Kagyu Samye Ling was founded in 1967 by two spiritual masters, Choje Akong Tulku Rinpoche and Chogyam Trungpa Rinpoche. It was the first Tibetan Buddhist Centre to be established in the West and was named after Samye, the very first monastery to be established in Tibet. In 1977 during his second visit to Samye Ling, the 16th Karmapa assured Akong Rinpoche about the longer-term future of Buddhism in the West and at Samye Ling. It is from this encounter that the  Samye Project was born. Samyé Ling now has established centres in more than 20 countries, including Belgium, Ireland, Poland, South Africa, Spain and Switzerland.

Lama Shenpen Hookham, originally from Essex, travelled to India in the late 1960s on the instruction of Chögyam Trungpa Rinpoche, became one of a group of early Western women to take ordination as a nun in the Tibetan Buddhist tradition. She was taught by, and became a translator to many of Tibetan Buddhist masters, as was asked by 16th Karmapa to return to the West to teach. She was authorised to teach Mahamudra by Khenpo Tsultrim Gyamtso Rinpoche, who also encouraged her to return her monastic vows in order to teach Westerners. Lama Shenpen went on to establish the Awakened Heart Sangha and devised a unique, experiential training programme called Living the Awakened Heart, which presents the undiluted essence of Dzogchen and Mahamudra teachings and traditions, tailored especially for a Western audience. Lama Shenpen wrote about her time in India with her teachers and her path to becoming a lama in her autobiography Keeping the Dalai Lama Waiting & Other Stories - An English Woman's Journey to Becoming a Buddhist Lama, which has had many recommendations from other esteemed teachers, including Khandro Rinpoche.

Jamyang Buddhist Centre (JBC) in London is affiliated to the Foundation for the Preservation of the Mahayana Tradition, an international network of Gelugpa Tibetan Buddhist centres. There is also a branch centre in Leeds and affiliated groups around across England. The resident teacher is Geshe Tashi Tsering.

The Manjushri Institute, a large Buddhist college at Conishead Priory in Cumbria, was founded in 1976 under the guidance of Thubten Yeshe, a Tibetan Gelugpa monk. Buddhist organisations in the UK from the Tibetan tradition that have been founded by Western lamas include Dechen, Diamond Way Buddhism and Aro gTér. Dechen is an association of Buddhist centres of the Sakya and Karma Kagyu traditions, founded by Lama Jampa Thaye and under the spiritual authority of Karma Thinley Rinpoche. 'Diamond Way Buddhism' is a network of lay Buddhist centres in the Karma Kagyu tradition, founded by Lama Ole Nydahl and under the spiritual authority of the Trinley Thaye Dorje.

A Theravada monastic order following the Thai Forest Tradition of Ajahn Chah was established at Chithurst Buddhist Monastery in West Sussex in 1979, giving rise to branch monasteries elsewhere in the country, including the Amaravati Buddhist Monastery in the Chiltern Hills and Aruna Ratanagiri in Northumberland. Quite a number of notable Britons like Ajahn Khemadhammo, Ajahn Sucitto, Ajahn Amaro, Ajahn Brahm and Ajahn Jayasaro were ordained into this monastic order, become serious practitioners and dedicated Dhamma teachers. Ajahn Khemadhammo also began Buddhist prison chaplaincy work in 1977 and established "Angulimala, the Buddhist Prison Chaplaincy" in 1985.

A lay meditation tradition of Thai origin is represented by the Samatha Trust, with its headquarters retreat centre in Wales. Sōtō Zen has a priory at Throssel Hole Buddhist Abbey in Northumberland. The Community of Interbeing, part of the Order of Interbeing, founded by Vietnamese Zen Buddhist Thich Nhat Hanh (who currently resides in Plum Village, France), had about 90 sanghas meeting across the UK as of 2012. The Order of Interbeing (Tiep Hien) was founded within the Linji School of Dhyana Buddhism (Zen (Rinzai)).

New religious movements in Britain include the Triratna Buddhist Community (Previously known as Friends of the Western Buddhist Order), founded by the British teacher and writer Sangharakshita (Dennis Lingwood) in 1967, which has been associated with many allegations of abuse. The New Kadampa Tradition was founded by the Tibetan monk (formerly a Gelugpa) Kelsang Gyatso in 1991 when it took over the Manjushri Institute (Conishead Priory); its practices have sparked much controversy, including official rebukes by the Dalai Lama. There is also a UK section of the Soka Gakkai International, a worldwide organization which promotes a disputed, modernized version of the ancient Japanese Nichiren school of Mahayana Buddhism.

Interest in secular Buddhism, stripped of supernatural elements and doctrines that are deemed insufficiently rational (including ancient, shared Indian religious beliefs in rebirth and karma), has developed from the writings of the British author and teacher Stephen Batchelor.

Vidyamala Burch and her organization Breathworks have helped to popularize mindfulness-based pain management (MBPM), a mindfulness-based intervention (MBI) providing applications for people suffering from chronic pain and illness.

The British Association of Mindfulness-Based Approaches (BAMBA) is a network of 25 mindfulness teacher-training organizations that aims to support and develop good practice and integrity in the delivery of mindfulness-based approaches in the UK.

Regarding umbrella organizations, in addition to The Buddhist Society (active since 1924, with an office in London), The Network of Buddhist Organisations was established in 1993.

In 2012 Emma Slade, a British woman, became the first Western woman to be ordained as a Buddhist nun in Bhutan.

See also
Thomas William Rhys Davids
Hammalawa Saddhatissa
The Light of Asia, subtitled The Great Renunciation
Dhammakaya Tradition UK
Dhamma Talaka Pagoda
Oxford Centre for Buddhist Studies
Religion in the United Kingdom
Religion in the Republic of Ireland

References

Bibliography
Bell, Sandra (1991). Buddhism in Britain - Adaptation and Development, PhD thesis, University of Durham
 Bluck, Robert (2004). Buddhism and Ethnicity in Britain: The 2001 Census Data, Journal of Global Buddhism 5, 90-96
 
 Kay, David N. (2004). Tibetan and Zen Buddhism in Britain: Transplantation, Development and Adaptation, London; New York: RoutledgeCurzon

External links
United Kingdom at World Buddhist Directory
The Buddhist Society
BBC - British Buddhism
Reassessing what we collect website – Buddhist London History of Buddhist London with objects and images
Buddhism Today - Buddhism in United Kingdom
Jamyang
Kagyu Samye Dzong London
Dechen
Diamond Way Buddhism UK
Aro gTér

 
Religion in the United Kingdom
Uni
United Kingdom